Ibitirama is a municipality located in the Brazilian state of Espírito Santo. Its population was 8,859 (2020) and its area is 330 km2.

References

Municipalities in Espírito Santo